Le roi de Lahore ("The king of Lahore") is an opera in five acts by Jules Massenet to a French libretto by Louis Gallet.  It was first performed at the Palais Garnier in Paris on 27 April 1877 in costumes designed by Eugène Lacoste and settings designed by Jean Émile Daran (Act I, scene 1), Auguste Alfred Rubé and Philippe Chaperon (Act I, scene 2; Act V), Louis Chéret (Act II), Jean-Baptiste Lavastre (Act III), Antoine Lavastre and Eugène Louis Carpezat (Act IV).

Le roi de Lahore is the third of Massenet's operas produced in Paris and was his first major success there, spawning performances across Europe and leading to his place as one of the most popular composers of his time.

Performance history
Within a year of the premiere the opera was performed, for instance, in Turin, Rome, Bologna, and Venice. The Royal Opera House, Covent Garden, presented it in London in 1879, and in 1906 it premiered in Monte Carlo. The US premiere took place in 1883 at the French Opera House in New Orleans.

By the time of the Metropolitan Opera premiere in 1924, however, Le roi de Lahore in particular, and Massenet's style of romantic opera in general, faded in fashion so much that it received only six performances and has never been revived there since.

Contemporary performances include a revival by the Vancouver Opera in 1977 starring Joan Sutherland and conducted by Richard Bonynge. The same production was mounted at the San Francisco Opera and subsequently recorded. A more recent revival occurred at the Teatro La Fenice in Venice in 2005 under the baton of Marcello Viotti, a performance of which was released on CD and DVD.

Roles

Synopsis
Time: 11th century.

Act 1
Place: The temple of Indra, Lahore

The citizens of Lahore gather at the temple to pray for divine protection against the Moslem invaders, and receive encouragement from Timour, the high priest. Scindia, minister of King Alim is in love with Sita, his niece, who is also a priestess at the temple. Scindia asks Timour to release Sita from her vows, and points out that she has been meeting a young man.
In Indra's sanctuary, Scindia gets Sita to admit her interest in this young stranger, but she refuses to name him; Scindia accuses her of sacrilege, and the priests demand that she sing the evening prayer to lure the young man. A secret door opens and a young man appears: it is King Alim who confesses his love and asks for Sita's hand in marriage. Timour demands that the king expiate his actions by leading his army against the Muslims. Scindia schemes to arrange an ambush and kill the king.

Act 2
Place: The desert of Thôl

At the king's encampment, where Sita has followed and pitched camp near the king as she awaits his return from the fighting, resolved to declare her love for him. The soldiers have been routed. Scindia gets them to join with him to usurp the throne. Alim enters, wounded, and realizes that Scindia must have betrayed him, he dies in Sita's arms. Scindia returns and triumphs over Alim's body; he declares himself the king and leaves for Lahore with Sita prisoner.

Act 3
Place: The Paradise of Indra, Mount Meru

There are songs and dances by the apsaras. Alim’s soul arrives but he admits to Indra that he misses the presence of Sita. Indra takes pity and agrees to restore Alim to life – as the humblest of beings – for as long as Sita lives, after which they will both die together; Alim happily agrees.

Act 4
Place: a palace room in Lahore

Sita laments her fate and begs Indra to re-unite her with Alim. Fanfares announce the approach of Scindia, and she renounces the crown, praying for death.

Place: the palace square

Alim awakens back in Lahore at the entrance to the royal palace where the crowd is gathering for Scindia's coronation. Scindia enters, on his way to persuade Sita to marry him, but a vengeful vision blocks his path. Alim appears to the onlookers like a poor madman, and is ordered to be seized, but Timour says that he must be a visionary inspired by god. As Sita's palanquin enters, Scindia welcomes her as his queen.

Act 5
Place: The sanctuary of Indra

Sita has sought refuge in Indra's sanctuary having fled forced marriage with Scindia. Alim is admitted to the sanctuary by Timour and the lovers meet again. Scindia arrives and threatens them both; Sita stabs herself and at once Alim again becomes a spirit, thus foiling the designs of Scindia. The temple walls change into a vision of paradise and Sita and Alim are united in celestial happiness, while Scindia falls to the ground in terror.

Recordings

References
Notes

Sources

External links

Le roi de Lahore: Visual documentation of the premiere on Gallica
Le roi de Lahore at Bob's Universe

Operas by Jules Massenet
French-language operas
Operas
1877 operas
Opera world premieres at the Paris Opera
Lahore in fiction
Operas set in Pakistan
Operas set in India